Stanley Little (1911 – May 15, 2000) was the founding National President of the Canadian Union of Public Employees from 1963 to 1975. He was also the President of the National Union of Public Service Employees from 1961 to 1963.

In his early years, Little worked in a factory, a supermarket, and hydro. He first became involved in the labour movement in 1931, initially as part of Local One of the National Union of Public Service Employees (NUPSE) in Toronto, and later as part of Local Eight in York. In 1951, he was hired as a full-time union representative by the NUPSE. Little was elected as the President of the union in 1961.

With the ultimate goal of having one big union in the Canadian public sector, Little successfully negotiated a merger with the National Union of Public Employees (NUPE). This led to the founding of the Canadian Union of Public Employees (CUPE) on September 24, 1963. Little was elected National President at CUPE's first national convention alongside Robert Rintoul, the former director of the NUPE, who was elected National Secretary-Treasurer. The new union started with 78,000 members coming from 483 locals. Within five years, CUPE's membership had increased to over 115,000, and by the time Little resigned as president, it was over 210,000, making it the largest union in the country.

References

1911 births
2000 deaths
Canadian Union of Public Employees people
Trade unionists from Ontario